The IZh-27 (ИЖ-27) is a double-barreled shotgun.

History 
IZh-27 was designed in early 1970s as a successor to the IZh-12. The first standard serial shotguns were made in 1972 and mass production began since 1973

In 1985, IZh-27 and TOZ-34 were the most common hunting shotguns in the Soviet Union. Also, a number of these shotguns were sold in foreign countries.

In the 1990s, the production of the IZh-27MM variant (IZh-27M chambered in 12/76 mm Magnum shotgun shells) began.

In September 2008, IZh-27 was renamed into MP-27 (Mechanical Plant - 27). Over 1.5 million IZh-27 shotguns were made.

Design 
IZh-27 is an over and under hammerless shotgun, with one barrel above the other.

The chrome-plated barrels are made from heat-treated 50RA steel (сталь 50PA)

It has a walnut or beech stock and fore-end. Some shotguns were equipped with rubber recoil pad.

Variants 
 IZh-27 (ИЖ-27)
 IZh-27-1S (ИЖ-27-1С) with a single selective trigger
 IZh-27E (ИЖ-27Е), with automatic ejectors - since 1973
 IZh-27E-1S (ИЖ-27Е-1С), with automatic ejectors and a single selective trigger - in 1976 it was awarded the golden medal of the Brno Exhibition
 IZh-27ST (ИЖ-27СТ), with 760mm barrels 3.3 - 3.4 kg
 IZh-27SK (ИЖ-27СK), with 660mm barrels 3.2 - 3.3 kg
 IZh-27M (ИЖ-27М) In September 2008, it was renamed into MP-27M
 IZh-27MM (ИЖ-27МM)

Users 

  - was allowed as civilian hunting weapon
  - is allowed as civilian hunting weapon
 
  - is allowed as civilian hunting weapon
  - is allowed as civilian hunting weapon
  - is allowed as civilian hunting weapon
  - European American Armory began importing IZh-27 shotguns from Russia in 1999. In January 2004, a contract was signed between Remington Arms (Madison, North Carolina) and the Izhevsk Mechanical Plant. In 2005 Remington Arms began importing IZh-27 shotguns from Russia, marketed and distributed as the Remington Spartan 310. Remington ceased importing the shotgun in 2009.

References

Sources 
 Universal/Baikal IJ-27E shotgun // "American Rifleman", December 1975
 Н. Изметинский, Л. Михайлов. ИЖ-27Е-27-1С - охотничье ружье с одним спуском // журнал «Охота и охотничье хозяйство», № 9, 1978. стр.30-32
 Л. Е. Михайлов, Н. Л. Изметинский. Ижевские охотничьи ружья. 2-е изд., испр. и доп. Ижевск, изд-во «Удмуртия», 1982. стр.160-187
 В. Н. Трофимов. Отечественные охотничьи ружья гладкоствольные. М., ДАИРС, 2000. стр.267-280
 Виктор Гордиенко. Главный калибр российского охотника // журнал «Мастер-ружьё», No. 1 (50), 2001. стр.112-117
 Baikal IZH-27 // "American Rifleman", May 2001

External links
 IZh-27 / Internet Movie Firearms Database

Double-barreled shotguns of the Soviet Union
Double-barreled shotguns of Russia
Izhevsk Mechanical Plant products